Double Agent was a made for TV film from Walt Disney Television directed by Michael Vejar. It starred Michael McKean, Susan Walden, Christopher Burton, Judith Jones, and Lloyd Bochner. Additional cast included Del Zamora, John Putch, Alexa Hamilton, Jane A. Johnston, Lois January, Saveli Kramarov, Allan Kolman, and Big John Studd. Double Agent was first telecast on ABC March 29, 1987, on The Disney Sunday Movie series.

Synopsis
Jason Starr is an international spy. While on a mission there was an altercation and Jason disappears. His boss Vaughn then goes to his twin brother Warren Starbinder, a veterinarian, and asks him to pose as Jason so to complete his mission.  Warren agrees to do so but the talk will not be easy since he is not a spy. Warren also cannot tell his wife and family what he's doing which makes it hard for him to explain the peculiar ways he is now behaving. He is supposed to deliver a quarter million dollars in exchange for an overlay of a secret document. From being chased by the KGB and an ex-NSB agent who is out for revenge, to spicy car chases and action sequences all the while maintaining his family's trust through deceit, this movie is a comic treat. The ending springs a surprise in the identity of Scorpion, the primary villain.

References in film
Lloyd Bochner costars as "Secret Agent Vaughn"—a reference to The Man from U.N.C.L.E. star Robert Vaughn.

External links
Double Agent at The New York Times
 
 
Double Agent at Blogspot
MSN Movies

1987 television films
1987 films
American spy films
American spy comedy films
ABC network original films
Disney television films
1980s spy comedy films
Films directed by Michael Vejar
1980s American films